The index of physics articles is split into multiple pages due to its size.

To navigate by individual letter use the table of contents below.

O

OECC
OPAL detector
OPERA experiment
OSA Fellow
OSO 3
OSO 7
OVRO 40 meter Telescope
OZI Rule
Oak Ridge National Laboratory
Oberth effect
Objective (optics)
Oblique correction
Oblique shock
Oblique wing
Observable
Observable universe
Observational cosmology
Observer (physics)
Observer (special relativity)
Observer effect (physics)
Ocean gyre
Ocean thermal energy conversion
Oceanography
Ocellus Lucanus
Octavio Novaro
Odd molecule
Odd sympathy
Oersted
Oersted Medal
Ofer Biham
Ofer Lahav
Off-axis optical system
Oganesson
Ogden Rood
Ohm
Ohm's law
Ohmic contact
Ohnesorge number
Oil drop experiment
Okorokov effect
Ola Hunderi
Olaf Dreyer
Olami–Feder–Christensen model
Olav Holt
Olbers' paradox
Old quantum theory
Oldroyd-B model
Ole Jacob Broch
Oleg D. Jefimenko
Oleg Firsov
Oleg Losev
Oleg Sushkov
Olexander Smakula
Olga Kennard
Olinto De Pretto
Oliver E. Buckley Condensed Matter Prize
Oliver Heaviside
Oliver Lodge
Olli Lounasmaa
Olympia Academy
Omega baryon
Omega meson
On-Line Isotope Mass Separator
On Physical Lines of Force
On shell and off shell
On the Shoulders of Giants (book)
On the movement of small particles suspended in a stationary liquid demanded by the molecular-kinetic theory of heat
One-electron universe
One-loop Feynman diagram
One-way speed of light
Onium
Online refuelling
Onsager reciprocal relations
Onset of deconfinement
Oops-Leon
Oort constants
Opacity (optics)
Opalescence
Open-pool Australian lightwater reactor
OpenFOAM
OpenScientist
Open Source Physics
Open quantum system
Open shell
Operator (physics)
Operator product expansion
Oppenheimer–Phillips process
Optic crystals
Optical Fiber Technology
Optical Gravitational Lensing Experiment
Optical Physics
Optical Review
Optical Society
Optical Society of Japan
Optical aberration
Optical amplifier
Optical autocorrelation
Optical axis
Optical black hole
Optical brightener
Optical cavity
Optical chopper
Optical circulator
Optical coating
Optical coherence tomography
Optical communication
Optical conductivity
Optical contact bonding
Optical depth
Optical downconverter
Optical equivalence theorem
Optical feedback
Optical field
Optical flat
Optical force
Optical format
Optical lattice
Optical lens design
Optical levitation
Optical medium
Optical metamaterial
Optical microsphere
Optical modulator
Optical modulators using semiconductor nano-structures
Optical neural network
Optical parametric amplifier
Optical parametric oscillator
Optical path
Optical path length
Optical phenomenon
Optical phonon
Optical physics
Optical power
Optical properties of carbon nanotubes
Optical pulsar
Optical pumping
Optical reader
Optical rectification
Optical ring resonators
Optical rotatory dispersion
Optical scalars
Optical science
Optical sciences
Optical sectioning
Optical sine theorem
Optical superresolution
Optical switch
Optical telescope
Optical theorem
Optical train
Optical transition radiation
Optical tweezers
Optical window
Optically stimulated luminescence
Opticks
Optics
Optics & Photonics News
Optics (physics)
Optics Classification and Indexing Scheme
Optics Communications
Optics Express
Optics Letters
Optics and Photonics News
Optics and Spectroscopy
Optik (journal)
Optoelectric nuclear battery
Optoelectronics
Optofluidics
Optomechanics
Orb (optics)
Orbit
Orbit (dynamics)
Orbit equation
Orbit phasing
Orbital angular momentum multiplexing
Orbital angular momentum of light
Orbital decay
Orbital eccentricity
Orbital elements
Orbital inclination
Orbital integral
Orbital mechanics
Orbital motion
Orbital motion (quantum)
Orbital node
Orbital period
Orbital plane (astronomy)
Orbital state vectors
Orbiting body
Orbitrap
Ordal Demokan
Order and disorder (physics)
Order operator
Ordered exponential
Orders of magnitude (charge)
Orders of magnitude (density)
Orders of magnitude (energy)
Orders of magnitude (entropy)
Orders of magnitude (force)
Orders of magnitude (length)
Orders of magnitude (luminous flux)
Orders of magnitude (magnetic field)
Orders of magnitude (mass)
Orders of magnitude (power)
Orders of magnitude (pressure)
Orders of magnitude (radiation)
Orders of magnitude (resistance)
Orders of magnitude (specific energy density)
Orders of magnitude (specific heat capacity)
Orders of magnitude (temperature)
Orders of magnitude (voltage)
Orest Khvolson
Oreste Piccioni
Orfeu Bertolami
Organic field-effect transistor
Organic nonlinear optical materials
Organic photorefractive materials
Organic superconductor
Orientifold
Orifice plate
Origin of avian flight
Ornstein–Zernike equation
Orr–Sommerfeld equation
Orso Mario Corbino
OrthoCAD Network Research Cell
Orthobaric density
Orthometric height
Orthomode transducer
Orthorhombic crystal system
Orthovoltage X-rays
Osborne Reynolds
Oscar Lanford
Oscar Sala
Oscar W. Greenberg
Oscillation
Oscillator linewidth
Oscillator phase noise
Oscillatory universe
Oscillon
Osculating orbit
Oseen's approximation
Oseen equations
Oskar Heil
Oskar Klein
Oskar Klein Memorial Lecture
Oskar Ritter
Osmosis
Osoaviakhim-1
Ostro
Ostwald ripening
Ostwald–Freundlich equation
Otoacoustic emission
Ottaviano-Fabrizio Mossotti
Otto Bastiansen
Otto Hahn
Otto Haxel
Otto Klemperer (physicist)
Otto Kratky
Otto Laporte
Otto Laporte Award
Otto Lehmann (physicist)
Otto Lummer
Otto Robert Frisch
Otto Scherzer
Otto Schmitt
Otto Stern
Otto Wiener (physicist)
Otto cycle
Otto von Guericke
Otto Øgrim
Our Mr. Sun
Outdoor–indoor transmission class
Outflow channels
Outhouse (unit)
Outline of applied physics
Outline of astronomy
Outline of geophysics
Outline of physical science
Outline of physics
Ouzo effect
Over/under cable coiling
Overflow (software)
Overlap matrix
Overtone
Owen Chamberlain
Owen Willans Richardson
Oxford Calculators
Oxford Electric Bell
Oxide thin-film transistor
Oxsensis
Oxygen-burning process
Oxygen permeability
Oyo Buturi
Øyvind Grøn
Ozsváth–Schücking metric

Indexes of physics articles